In military terms, 102nd Brigade may refer to:

 102nd (Tyneside Scottish) Brigade, a British unit during WWI
 102nd Logistic Brigade (United Kingdom)
 102nd Panzer Brigade
 102nd Territorial Defense Brigade (Ukraine)